The regulatory T cells (Tregs  or Treg cells), formerly known as suppressor T cells, are a subpopulation of T cells that modulate the immune system, maintain tolerance to self-antigens, and prevent autoimmune disease. Treg cells are immunosuppressive and generally suppress or downregulate induction and proliferation of effector T cells. Treg cells express the biomarkers CD4, FOXP3, and CD25 and are thought to be derived from the same lineage as naïve CD4+ cells. Because effector T cells also express CD4 and CD25,  Treg cells are very difficult to effectively discern from effector CD4+, making them difficult to study. Research has found that the cytokine transforming growth factor beta (TGF-β) is essential for Treg cells to differentiate from naïve CD4+ cells and is important in maintaining Treg cell homeostasis.

Mouse models have suggested that modulation of Treg cells can treat autoimmune disease and cancer and can facilitate organ transplantation and wound healing. Their implications for cancer are complicated. Treg cells tend to be upregulated in individuals with cancer, and they seem to be recruited to the site of many tumors. Studies in both humans and animal models have implicated that high numbers of Treg cells in the tumor microenvironment is indicative of a poor prognosis, and Treg cells are thought to suppress tumor immunity, thus hindering the body's innate ability to control the growth of cancerous cells. Immunotherapy research is studying how regulation of T cells could possibly be utilized in the treatment of cancer.

Populations
T regulatory cells are a component of the immune system that suppress immune responses of other cells. This is an important "self-check" built into the immune system to prevent excessive reactions. Regulatory T cells come in many forms with the most well-understood being those that express CD4, CD25, and FOXP3 (CD4+CD25+ regulatory T cells).  These Treg cells are different from helper T cells.  Another regulatory T cell subset is Treg17 cells. Regulatory T cells are involved in shutting down immune responses after they have successfully eliminated invading organisms, and also in preventing autoimmunity.
 
CD4+ FOXP3+ CD25(high) regulatory T cells have been called "naturally occurring" regulatory T cells to distinguish them from "suppressor" T cell populations that are generated in vitro. Additional regulatory T cell populations include Tr1, Th3, CD8+CD28−, and Qa-1 restricted T cells. The contribution of these populations to self-tolerance and immune homeostasis is less well defined. FOXP3 can be used as a good marker for mouse CD4+CD25+ T cells, although recent studies have also shown evidence for FOXP3 expression in CD4+CD25− T cells. In humans, FOXP3 is also expressed by recently activated conventional T cells and thus does not specifically identify human Tregs.

Development
All T cells derive from progenitor cells in the bone marrow, which become committed to their lineage in the thymus. All T cells begin as CD4-CD8-TCR- cells at the DN (double-negative) stage, where an individual cell will rearrange its T cell receptor genes to form a unique, functional molecule, which they, in turn, test against cells in the thymic cortex for a minimal level of interaction with self-MHC. If they receive these signals, they proliferate and express both CD4 and CD8, becoming double-positive cells. The selection of Tregs occurs on radio-resistant hematopoietically derived MHC class II-expressing cells in the medulla or Hassall's corpuscles in the thymus. At the DP (double-positive) stage, they are selected by their interaction with the cells within the thymus, begin the transcription of Foxp3, and become Treg cells, although they may not begin to express Foxp3 until the single-positive stage, at which point they are functional Tregs. Tregs do not have the limited TCR expression of NKT or γδ T cells; Tregs have a larger TCR diversity than effector T cells, biased towards self-peptides.

The process of Treg selection is determined by the affinity of interaction with the self-peptide MHC complex. Selection to become a Treg is a "Goldilocks" process - i.e. not too high, not too low, but just right; a T cell that receives very strong signals will undergo apoptotic death; a cell that receives a weak signal will survive and be selected to become an effector cell. If a T cell receives an intermediate signal, then it will become a regulatory cell. Due to the stochastic nature of the process of T cell activation, all T cell populations with a given TCR will end up with a mixture of Teff and Treg – the relative proportions determined by the affinities of the T cell for the self-peptide-MHC. Even in mouse models with TCR-transgenic cells selected on specific-antigen-secreting stroma, deletion or conversion is not complete.

Foxp3+ Treg generation in the thymus is delayed by several days compared to Teff cells and does not reach adult levels in either the thymus or periphery until around three weeks post-partum. Treg cells require CD28 co-stimulation and B7.2 expression is largely restricted to the medulla, the development of which seems to parallel the development of Foxp3+ cells. It has been suggested that the two are linked, but no definitive link between the processes has yet been shown. TGF-β is not required for Treg functionality, in the thymus, as thymic Tregs from TGF-β insensitive TGFβRII-DN mice are functional.

Thymic recirculation 

There was observed, that some FOXP3+ Treg cells are recirculating back to thymus, where they have developed. This Treg were mainly present in thymic medula, which is the main site of Treg cells differentiation.
The presence of this cells in thymus or addition into fetal thymic tissue culture suppress development of new Treg cells by 34–60%, but Tconv cells are not affected. That means, that recirculating Treg to thymus inhibited just de novo development of Treg cells.
Molecular mechanism of this process works due to the ability of Treg to adsorb IL-2 from the microenvironments, thus being able to induce apoptosis of other T cells which need IL-2 as main growth factor. Recirculating T reg cells in thymus express high amount of high affinity IL-2 receptor α chain (CD25) encoded by Il2ra gene which gather IL-2 from thymic medulla, and decrease its concentration. New generated FOXP3+ Treg cells in thymus have not so high amount of Il2ra expression. IL-2 is a cytokine necessary for the development of Treg cells in the thymus. It is important for T cells proliferation and survival, but in the case of its deficiency, IL-15 may be replaced. However, Treg cells' development is dependent on IL-2. In humans, there was found population of CD31 negative Treg cells in thymus. CD31 could be used as a marker of new generated Treg cells as same as other T lymphocytes. Mature and peripheral Treg cells have decreased its expression. So it is possible that this regulatory mechanism of thymic Treg cells development is also functional in humans.

There is probably also positive regulation of thymic Treg cells development caused by recirculating Treg cells into thymus. There was found population of CD24 low FOXP3+ in thymus with increased expression of IL-1R2 (Il1r2) compared with peripheral Treg cells. High concentration of IL-1β caused by inflammation decrease de novo development of Treg cells in thymus. The presence of recirculating Treg cells in the thymus with high IL1R2 expression during inflammatory conditions helps to uptake IL-1β and reduce its concentration in the medulla microenvironment, thus they are helping to the development of de novo Treg cells. High concentration of IL-1β caused by inflammation decrease de novo development of Treg cells in thymus.   Binding of IL-1β to IL1R2 on the surface of Treg cells does not cause any signal transduction because there is no present Intracellular (TIR) Toll interleukin-1 receptor domain, which is normally present in innate immune cells.

Function 

The immune system must be able to discriminate between self and non-self.  When self/non-self discrimination fails, the immune system destroys cells and tissues of the body and as a result causes autoimmune diseases. Regulatory T cells actively suppress activation of the immune system and prevent pathological self-reactivity, i.e. autoimmune disease.  The critical role regulatory T cells play within the immune system is evidenced by the severe autoimmune syndrome that results from a genetic deficiency in regulatory T cells (IPEX syndrome – see also below).

The molecular mechanism by which regulatory T cells exert their suppressor/regulatory activity has not been definitively characterized and is the subject of intense research.  In vitro experiments have given mixed results regarding the requirement of cell-to-cell contact with the cell being suppressed. The following represent some of the proposed mechanisms of immune suppression:

 Regulatory T cells produce a number of inhibitory cytokines. These include TGF-β, Interleukin 35, and Interleukin 10. It also appears that regulatory T cells can induce other cell types to express interleukin-10.
 Regulatory T cells can produce Granzyme B, which in turn can induce apoptosis of effector cells. Regulatory T cells from Granzyme B deficient mice are reported to be less effective suppressors of the activation of effector T cells.
 Reverse signalling through direct interaction with dendritic cells and the induction of immunosuppressive indoleamine 2,3-dioxygenase.
 Signalling through the ectoenzymes CD39 and CD73 with the production of immunosuppressive adenosine.
 Through direct interactions with dendritic cells by LAG3 and by TIGIT. This review of Treg interactions with dendritic cells provides distinction between mechanisms described for human cells versus mouse cells.
 Another control mechanism is through the IL-2 feedback loop. Antigen-activated T cells produce IL-2 which then acts on IL-2 receptors on regulatory T cells alerting them to the fact that high T cell activity is occurring in the region, and they mount a suppressory response against them. This is a negative feedback loop to ensure that overreaction is not occurring. If an actual infection is present other inflammatory factors downregulate the suppression. Disruption of the loop leads to hyperreactivity, regulation can modify the strength of the immune response. A related suggestion with regard to interleukin 2 is that activated regulatory T cells take up interleukin 2 so avidly that they deprive effector T cells of sufficient to avoid apoptosis.
 A major mechanism of suppression by regulatory T cells is through the prevention of co-stimulation through CD28 on effector T cells by the action of the molecule CTLA-4.

Induced regulatory T cells 

Induced regulatory T (iTreg) cells (CD4+ CD25+ FOXP3+) are suppressive cells involved in tolerance. iTreg cells have been shown to suppress T cell proliferation and experimental autoimmune diseases. These cells include Treg17 cells. iTreg cells develop from mature CD4+ conventional T cells outside of the thymus: a defining distinction between natural regulatory T (nTreg) cells and iTreg cells. Though iTreg and nTreg cells share a similar function iTreg cells have recently been shown to be "an essential non-redundant regulatory subset that supplements nTreg cells, in part by expanding TCR diversity within regulatory responses". Acute depletion of the iTreg cell pool in mouse models has resulted in inflammation and weight loss. The contribution of nTreg cells versus iTreg cells in maintaining tolerance is unknown, but both are important. Epigenetic differences have been observed between nTreg and iTreg cells, with the former having more stable FOXP3 expression and wider demethylation.

The small intestinal environment is high in vitamin A and is a location where retinoic acid is produced. The retinoic acid and TGF-beta produced by dendritic cells within this area signal for production of regulatory T cells. Vitamin A and TGF-beta promote T cell differentiation into regulatory T cells opposed to Th17 cells, even in the presence of IL-6. The intestinal environment can lead to induced regulatory T cells with TGF-beta and retinoic acid, some of which express the lectin-like receptor CD161 and are specialized to maintain barrier integrity by accelerating wound healing. The Tregs within the gut are differentiated from naïve T cells after antigen is introduced. It has recently been shown that human regulatory T cells can be induced from both naive and pre-committed Th1 cells and Th17 cells using a parasite-derived TGF-β mimic, secreted by Heligmosomoides polygyrus and termed Hp-TGM (H. polygyrus TGF-β mimic). Hp-TGM can induce murine FOXP3 expressing regulatory T cells that were stabile in presence of inflammation in vivo. Hp-TGM-induced human FOXP3+ regulatory T cells were stable in the presence of inflammation and had increased levels of CD25, CTLA4 and decreased methylation in the FOXP3 Treg-Specific demethylated region compared to TGF-β-induced Tregs.

Disease

An important question in the field of immunology is how the immunosuppressive activity of regulatory T cells is modulated during the course of an ongoing immune response.  While the immunosuppressive function of regulatory T cells prevents the development of autoimmune disease, it is not desirable during immune responses to infectious microorganisms. Current hypotheses suggest that, upon encounter with infectious microorganisms, the activity of regulatory T cells may be downregulated, either directly or indirectly, by other cells to facilitate elimination of the infection. Experimental evidence from mouse models suggests that some pathogens may have evolved to manipulate regulatory T cells to immunosuppress the host and so potentiate their own survival. For example, regulatory T cell activity has been reported to increase in several infectious contexts, such as retroviral infections (the most well-known of which is HIV), mycobacterial infections (e.g., tuberculosis), and various parasitic infections including Leishmania and malaria.

Treg cells play major roles during HIV infection. They suppress the immune system, thus limiting target cells and reducing inflammation, but this simultaneously disrupts the clearance of virus by the cell-mediated immune response and enhances the reservoir by pushing CD4+ T cells to a resting state, including infected cells. Additionally, Treg cells can be infected by HIV, increasing the size of the HIV reservoir directly. Thus, Treg cells are being investigated as targets for HIV cure research. Some Treg cell depletion strategies have been tested in SIV infected nonhuman primates, and shown to cause viral reactivation and enhanced SIV specific CD8+ T cell responses.

Regulatory T cells have a large role in the pathology of visceral leishmaniasis and in preventing excess inflammation in patients cured of visceral leishmaniasis.

CD4+ regulatory T cells are often associated with solid tumours in both humans and murine models. Increased numbers of regulatory T cells in breast, colorectal and ovarian cancers is associated with a poorer prognosis.

CD70+ non-Hodgkin lymphoma B cells induce FOXP3 expression and regulatory function in intratumoral CD4+CD25− T cells.

There is some evidence that Treg cells may be dysfunctional and driving neuroinflammation in amyotrophic lateral sclerosis due to lower expression of FOXP3. Ex vivo expansion of Treg cells for subsequent autologous transplant is currently being investigated after promising results were obtained in a phase I clinical trial.

Additionally, while regulatory T cells have been shown to increase via polyclonal expansion both systemically and locally during healthy pregnancies to protect the fetus from the maternal immune response (a process called maternal immune tolerance), there is evidence that this polyclonal expansion is impaired in preeclamptic mothers and their offspring. Research suggests reduced production and development of regulatory T cells during preeclampsia may degrade maternal immune tolerance, leading to the hyperactive immune response characteristic of preeclampsia.

Cancer 

Most tumors elicit an immune response in the host that is mediated by tumor antigens, thus distinguishing the tumor from other non-cancerous cells. This causes large numbers of tumor-infiltrating lymphocytes (TILs) to be found in the tumor microenvironment. Although it is not entirely understood, it is thought that these lymphocytes target cancerous cells and therefore slow or terminate the development of the tumor. However, this process is complicated because Treg cells seem to be preferentially trafficked to the tumor microenvironment. While Treg cells normally make up only about 4% of CD4+ T cells, they can make up as much as 20–30% of the total CD4+ population around the tumor microenvironment.

Although high levels of TILs were initially thought to be important in determining an immune response against cancer, it is now widely recognized that the ratio of Treg to effector T cells in the tumor microenvironment is a determining factor in the success of the immune response against the cancer. High levels of Treg cells in the tumor microenvironment are associated with poor prognosis in many cancers, such as ovarian, breast, renal, and pancreatic cancer. This indicates that Treg cells suppress effector T cells and hinder the body's immune response against the cancer. However, in some types of cancer the opposite is true, and high levels of Treg cells are associated with a positive prognosis. This trend is seen in cancers such as colorectal carcinoma and follicular lymphoma. This could be due to Treg cells' ability to suppress general inflammation which is known to trigger cell proliferation and metastasis . These opposite effects indicate that Treg cells' role in the development of cancer is highly dependent on both type and location of the tumor.

Although it is still not entirely understood how Treg cells are preferentially trafficked to the tumor microenvironment, the chemotaxis is probably driven by the production of chemokines by the tumor. Treg infiltration into the tumor microenvironment is facilitated by the binding of the chemokine receptor CCR4, which is expressed on Treg cells, to its ligand CCL22, which is secreted by many types of tumor cells. Treg cell expansion at the site of the tumor could also explain the increased levels of Treg cells. The cytokine, TGF-β, which is commonly produced by tumor cells, is known to induce the differentiation and expansion of Treg cells.

Forkhead box protein 3 (FOXP3) as a transcription factor is an essential molecular marker of Treg cells. FOXP3 polymorphism (rs3761548) might be involved in the gastric cancer progression through influencing Treg function and the secretion of immunomodulatory cytokines such as IL-10, IL-35, and TGF-β.

In general, the immunosuppression of the tumor microenvironment has largely contributed to the unsuccessful outcomes of many cancer immunotherapy treatments. Depletion of Treg cells in animal models has shown an increased efficacy of immunotherapy treatments, and therefore, many immunotherapy treatments are now incorporating Treg depletion.

Molecular characterization 
Similar to other T cells, regulatory T cells develop in the thymus.  The latest research suggests that regulatory T cells are defined by expression of the forkhead family transcription factor FOXP3 (forkhead box p3).  Expression of FOXP3 is required for regulatory T cell development and appears to control a genetic program specifying this cell's fate. The large majority of Foxp3-expressing regulatory T cells are found within the major histocompatibility complex (MHC) class II restricted CD4-expressing (CD4+) population and express high levels of the interleukin-2 receptor alpha chain (CD25).  In addition to the FOXP3-expressing CD4+ CD25+, there also appears to be a minor population of MHC class I restricted CD8+ FOXP3-expressing regulatory T cells. These FOXP3-expressing CD8+ T cells do not appear to be functional in healthy individuals but are induced in autoimmune disease states by T cell receptor stimulation to suppress IL-17-mediated immune responses. Unlike conventional T cells, regulatory T cells do not produce IL-2 and are therefore anergic at baseline.

A number of different methods are employed in research to identify and monitor Treg cells. Originally, high expression of CD25 and CD4 surface markers was used (CD4+CD25+ cells). This is problematic as CD25 is also expressed on non-regulatory T cells in the setting of immune activation such as during an immune response to a pathogen. As defined by CD4 and CD25 expression, regulatory T cells comprise about 5–10% of the mature CD4+ T cell subpopulation in mice and humans, while about 1–2% of Treg can be measured in whole blood. The additional measurement of cellular expression of FOXP3 protein allowed a more specific analysis of Treg cells (CD4+CD25+FOXP3+ cells). However, FOXP3 is also transiently expressed in activated human effector T cells, thus complicating a correct Treg analysis using CD4, CD25 and FOXP3 as markers in humans. Therefore, the gold standard surface marker combination to defined Tregs within unactivated CD3+CD4+ T cells is high CD25 expression combined with the absent or low-level expression of the surface protein CD127 (IL-7RA). If viable cells are not required then the addition of FOXP3 to the CD25 and CD127 combination will provide further stringency. Several additional markers have been described, e.g., high levels of CTLA-4 (cytotoxic T-lymphocyte associated molecule-4) and GITR (glucocorticoid-induced TNF receptor) are also expressed on regulatory T cells, however the functional significance of this expression remains to be defined.  There is a great interest in identifying cell surface markers that are uniquely and specifically expressed on all FOXP3-expressing regulatory T cells.  However, to date no such molecule has been identified.

The identification of Tregs following cell activation is challenging as conventional T cells will express CD25, transiently express FOXP3 and lose CD127 expression upon activation. It has been shown that Tregs can be detected using an activation-induced marker assay by expression of CD39 in combination with co-expression of CD25 and OX40(CD134) which define antigen-specific cells following 24-48h stimulation with antigen.

In addition to the search for novel protein markers, a different method to analyze and monitor Treg cells more accurately has been described in the literature. This method is based on DNA methylation analysis. Only in Treg cells, but not in any other cell type, including activated effector T cells, a certain region within the  gene (TSDR, Treg-specific-demethylated region) is found demethylated, which allows to monitor Treg cells through a PCR reaction or other DNA-based analysis methods.
Interplay between the Th17 cells and regulatory T cells are important in many diseases like respiratory diseases.

Recent evidence suggests that mast cells may be important mediators of Treg-dependent peripheral tolerance.

Epitopes
Regulatory T cell epitopes ('Tregitopes') were discovered in 2008 and consist of linear sequences of amino acids contained within monoclonal antibodies and immunoglobulin G (IgG).  Since their discovery, evidence has indicated Tregitopes may be crucial to the activation of natural regulatory T cells.

Potential applications of regulatory T cell epitopes have been hypothesised: tolerisation to transplants, protein drugs, blood transfer therapies, and type I diabetes as well as reduction of immune response for the treatment of allergies.

Genetic deficiency
Genetic mutations in the gene encoding FOXP3 have been identified in both humans and mice based on the heritable disease caused by these mutations.  This disease provides the most striking evidence that regulatory T cells play a critical role in maintaining normal immune system function. Humans with mutations in FOXP3 develop a severe and rapidly fatal autoimmune disorder known as Immune dysregulation, Polyendocrinopathy, Enteropathy X-linked (IPEX) syndrome.

The IPEX syndrome is characterized by the development of overwhelming systemic autoimmunity in the first year of life, resulting in the commonly observed triad of watery diarrhea, eczematous dermatitis, and endocrinopathy seen most commonly as insulin-dependent diabetes mellitus. Most individuals have other autoimmune phenomena including Coombs-positive hemolytic anemia, autoimmune thrombocytopenia, autoimmune neutropenia, and tubular nephropathy. The majority of affected males die within the first year of life of either metabolic derangements or sepsis.  An analogous disease is also observed in a spontaneous FOXP3-mutant mouse known as "scurfy".

References

External links 
 

T cells
Human cells